"When Under Ether" is a song written by PJ Harvey for her album White Chalk (2007). It was released as the album's first single in September 2007. This song was #32 on Rolling Stones list of the 100 Best Songs of 2007 and reached number 101 in the UK Singles Chart.

Single
"When Under Ether" was released as the lead single for White Chalk on 17 September 2007, in both digital download and limited edition 7" vinyl formats. The b-side is "Wait", a song which Harvey composed and recorded in 1988, rumoured to be one of her first recordings.

Composition
Harvey wrote "When Under Ether" and produced it along with Flood and John Parish. It is set in common time and composed in the key of F minor. Throughout the course of the song, Harvey's vocal range spans over one octave from C4-A♭4. Like the majority of songs that appear on White Chalk, "When Under Ether" was written and performed on the piano, which is a departure from prior PJ Harvey albums. It is also similar to the other tracks in that it is short in length and sung in a higher register than expected.

Musically, the song is quite sparse, centering on Harvey's vocals – which have an airy, otherworldly quality to them – and a subtle, repetitive piano melody. According to critic Joshua Klein, "the simple repetitive pattern that gently drives 'When Under Ether' drips with menace." Drums, autoharp, and organ accompany the main components of the song and are low in the mix.
The lyrics and the title quote T.S. Eliot's Four Quartets (East Coker- movement number III) which seems to be a prominent influence on some other songs from the album (for example "The Mountains"). Eliot's words are "[...] Or when, under ether, the mind is conscious but conscious of nothing - I said to my soul, be still, and wait without hope"; the theme of that section of the poem is about the feelings of the traveler. East Coker is a small village in Somerset not far from Yeovil, where P. J. Harvey was born.

The lyrics may indicate something as innocent as a dream dissolving into the clouds under diethyl ether intoxication, but while one critic takes the song as an account of a "harrowing" birth under archaic medical conditions, some critics such as Heather Phares hint that they "quite possibly" refer to "abortion, since unwanted children are some of the many broken family ties that haunt the album". However, when asked directly during an interview in The Guardian, Harvey replied, "That's obviously what you hear, but for me it's not actually tied to anything specific, like an abortion. These aren't just words. They're songs. They inhabit themselves, really".

Track listings
UK 7" single (1747513)
"When Under Ether" – 2:25
"Wait" – 2:17

US promotional CD (N/A)
"When Under Ether" – 2:25
"Wait" – 2:17
Interviews – 14:32

EU promotional CD (WHENCDPRO1)
"When Under Ether" – 2:25

Personnel
All personnel credits adapted from the album's liner notes.

Musicians
PJ Harvey – vocals, piano, acoustic guitar
John Parish – drums, acoustic guitar
Eric Drew Feldman – keyboards

Technical personnel
Flood – producer, engineer, mixing
John Parish – producer, mixing
PJ Harvey – producer, mixing, additional engineer
Catherine Marks – assistant engineer
Andrew Savors – assistant engineer
Ali Chant – additional engineer
John Dent – mastering

Design personnel
Maria Mochnacz – artwork, photography

Chart positions

Further reading
Hogan, Marc (2007). PJ Harvey "When Under Ether", Pitchfork. Retrieved 10 June 2008.
Klingman, Jeff (2007). PJ Harvey "When Under Ether" "Track Review", Prefixmag.com. Retrieved 10 June 2008.

References

2007 singles
PJ Harvey songs
Song recordings produced by Flood (producer)
Songs written by PJ Harvey
2007 songs
Island Records singles